Sir Frederic Calland Williams,  (26 June 1911 – 11 August 1977), known as F.C. Williams or Freddie Williams, was an English engineer, a pioneer in radar and computer technology.

Education
Williams was born in Romiley, Stockport, and educated at Stockport Grammar School. He gained a scholarship to study engineering at the University of Manchester where he was awarded Bachelor of Science and Master of Science degrees. He was awarded a Doctor of Philosophy degree in 1936 for research carried out as a postgraduate student of Magdalen College, Oxford.

Research and career
Working at the Telecommunications Research Establishment (TRE), Williams was a substantial contributor during World War II to the development of radar.

In 1946 he was appointed as head of the Electrical Engineering Department of the University of Manchester. There, with Tom Kilburn and Geoff Tootill, he built the first electronic stored-program digital computer, the Manchester Baby.

Williams is also recognised for his invention of the Williams tube, an early memory device. He supervised the research of his PhD students Richard Grimsdale and Tom Kilburn.

Awards and honours
Williams was elected a Fellow of the Royal Society (FRS) in 1950. His nomination reads

Personal life
Williams died in Manchester in 1977, aged 66.

References

1911 births
1977 deaths
Academics of the Victoria University of Manchester
Alumni of Magdalen College, Oxford
Alumni of the Victoria University of Manchester
Commanders of the Order of the British Empire
English electrical engineers
Fellows of the Royal Society
History of computing in the United Kingdom
Knights Bachelor
People educated at Stockport Grammar School
People from Stockport
People associated with the Department of Computer Science, University of Manchester
Engineers from Lancashire